Aku may refer to:
 Aku, Nigeria, a town in Enugu State
 "Aku" (poem), 1943, by Chairil Anwar
 Aku people of Gambia
 Aku dialect, a dialect of Sierra Leone Krio
 Aku, the main antagonist of the animated series Samurai Jack
 The Hawaiian word for skipjack tuna
 Hal Lewis (Aku), a former Hawaii radio presenter
 Aku (given name)
 Aku (album), by Japanese band MUCC (2020)

AKU may refer to:
 Aksu Airport, China (IATA code AKU)
 Aryabhatta Knowledge University, Bihar, India
 Adaptation kit upgrade, for updating Windows Mobile
 Aga Khan University, Pakistan, East Africa, and the UK.
 Al-Kafaàt University, Beirut, Lebanon
 Alkaptonuria, or black urine disease
 Algemene Kunstzijde Unie, a Dutch company merged into Akzo Nobel

See also 
 Aku Aku (disambiguation)